Michael Lembeck (born June 25, 1948) is an American actor and television and film director. Best known as Max Horvath in One Day at a Time (1979-1984).

Life and career

Lembeck was born in Brooklyn, New York, the son of Caroline Dubs and Harvey Lembeck, an actor and comedian. His parents practiced the Jewish faith. He began acting in the late 1960s and directing in the 1970s.

His most notable acting role was as Julie Cooper (Mackenzie Phillips)'s husband, Max Horvath, on the sitcom One Day at a Time. He played newscaster Clete Meizenheimer on the series Mary Hartman, Mary Hartman.

In 1975, he appeared on Barney Miller in the episode "Hair" as Officer Guardeno.  He also played Kaptain Kool of the fictional band Kaptain Kool and the Kongs on The Krofft Supershow from 1976 to 1978. He is also known for his role as Vinnie Fazio in The Boys in Company C in 1978. He was a member of the cast of the 1985–1986 situation comedy Foley Square. He appeared with his father, actor Harvey Lembeck, in an episode of The Partridge Family in 1971.

Lembeck has had collaborations with actor Peter Boyle (with whom he had previously appeared as an actor in Conspiracy: The Trial of the Chicago 8) in both The Santa Clause 2 and its sequel The Santa Clause 3: The Escape Clause. Lembeck also directed Boyle in a number of episodes of Everybody Loves Raymond.

Lembeck's first film appearance came in the 1968 film Hang 'Em High where he portrays “Marvin,” a store clerk with two spoken lines, in which he asks the proprietor where to store blankets. He later acted in The In-Laws. He directed The Santa Clause 2 and The Santa Clause 3: The Escape Clause, as well as the Nia Vardalos film Connie and Carla and Tooth Fairy.

Lembeck now works as a full-time film and TV director. He won an Emmy for his work on the Friends episode "The One After the Superbowl".  He also directed 20 other episodes of the series.

Personal life
Lembeck is married to his second wife, retired actress Lorna Patterson. They raised two children, daughter Mimi and son Sam.

Awards
Lembeck's work has received recognition from the Directors Guild of America, and the Academy of Television Arts and Sciences (also known as the ATAS).

 1996 WON - Primetime Emmy award for Outstanding Directing for a Comedy Series ("The One After the Superbowl") (Friends)
 1999 Nominated - Primetime Emmy award for Outstanding Directing for a Comedy Series ("The One Where Everybody Finds Out") (Friends)
 2000 Nominated - Primetime Emmy award for Outstanding Directing for a Comedy Series ("The One That Could Have Been (Part 1 & 2)") (Friends)
 2012 Nominated - Directors Guild award for Outstanding Directorial Achievement in Children's Programs (Sharpay's Fabulous Adventure)
 2017 Nominated - Directors Guild award for Outstanding Directorial Achievement in Children's Programs (A Nutcracker Christmas)

Filmography

Film
 The Santa Clause 2 (2002)
 Connie and Carla (2004)
 The Santa Clause 3: The Escape Clause (2006)
 Tooth Fairy (2010)
 Queen Bees (2021)
 The J Team (2021)

Direct-to-video
 The Clique (2008)
 Sharpay's Fabulous Adventure (2011) (Also co-producer)

Acting roles

Television
TV movies
 Acting Sheriff (1991)
 Boys & Girls (1996)
 Carly (1998)
 True Love (1999)
 The Peter Principle (2000)
 From Where I Sit (2000)
 Loomis (2001)
 Untitled Oakley & Weinstein Project (2005)
 So Here's What Happened (2006)
 The Bling Ring (2011)
 Homeboys (2013)
 A Nutcracker Christmas (2016)

TV series

Acting roles

References

External links

1948 births
21st-century American Jews
American male television actors
American television directors
Jewish American male actors
Living people
Male actors from New York City
People from Brooklyn
Film directors from New York City